Persebsi stands for Persatuan Sepakbola Sibolga (en: Football Association of Sibolga). Persebsi Sibolga is an  Indonesian football club based in Sibolga, North Sumatra. Club played in Liga 3.

References

External links
Liga-Indonesia.co.id

Sibolga
Football clubs in Indonesia
Football clubs in North Sumatra
Association football clubs established in 2008
2008 establishments in Indonesia